Football Queensland South Coast is a Football Queensland administrative zone encompassing the Gold Coast and surrounding areas in South-East Queensland and North-East New South Wales, including Kingscliff, Tweed Heads, Murwillumbah and Beaudesert.  The premier men's football competition is the Football Queensland Premier League 3 − South Coast and the premier women's football competition is the Football Queensland Women's Premier League 3 − South Coast. The administrative zone also has a numerous variety of lower divisions for both men and women, as well as academy and junior competitions to develop soccer and fitness within the region.

The zone is a culmination of antecedent bodies initiating in 1975 as the Gold Coast and District Soccer Association, it has been recognised under various names since. In 2021, as part of Football Queensland reforms, the zone would be known as Football Queensland South Coast. The region has a variety of clubs playing in state competitions. Many of the smaller clubs located within the region act as 'feeder' clubs for those in higher divisions, most notably with NPL Queensland sides Gold Coast United and Gold Coast Knights taking in the South Coast's best footballers. The zone previously encompassed A-League Men side (known at the time as A-League) Gold Coast United. However, the club was omitted from the competition in 2012 following club financial issues.

History 

The organisation was established on 1 October 1975 as the Gold Coast and District Soccer Association when Barry Such, a local referee, conducted an inaugural general meeting, adopting a constitution and electing Jack Woodward, a solicitor based in Coolangatta, as the association's first president. The association administered a top-flight men's football competition and in 1991, it was renamed to the Gold Coast Premier League. Following restructuring within Football Queensland in 2021, the senior men's and women's competitions were renamed and restructured to accommodate a new system of promotion and relegation within the state, allowing local clubs to compete at state level against teams from Brisbane, Darling Downs and the Sunshine Coast. As part of the reform process, the organisation sought to focus on improving four key areas of the game: Governance, Administration, Competitions and Affordability. The zone since establishment has focused on fostering and developing young Australians in the sport.

Member Clubs 
Teams in bold are playing within a Football Queensland state competition.

Former Clubs

Football Queensland South Coast Pyramids

Men's Pyramid 
The Football Queensland Premier League 3 − South Coast competition is the fourth tier in the Football Queensland pyramid and the fifth tier in the Australian pyramid. Each respective competition has its own reserve league primarily for senior academy players.

Women's Pyramid 
The Football Queensland Women's Premier League 3 − South Coast competition is the fourth tier in the Football Queensland pyramid and the fifth tier in the Australian pyramid. Each respective competition has its own reserve league primarily for senior academy players.

Antecedent bodies

See also 

 Football Queensland
 Football Australia
 Football Queensland Metro

Notes

References

External links

Football Queensland
Sport on the Gold Coast, Queensland
1975 establishments in Australia